Oranjemund (German for "Mouth of Orange") is a diamond mining town of 4,000 inhabitants situated in the ǁKaras Region of the extreme southwest of Namibia, on the northern bank of the Orange River mouth at the border to South Africa.

History
The entire area along the shore of the Atlantic Ocean was proclaimed restricted (the Sperrgebiet) in 1908 due to the occurrence of alluvial diamonds. Since then the public was forbidden to enter it. In 1927 diamonds were found south of the Orange River in South Africa. Hans Merensky and other prospectors assumed that the northern shore on South West African territory would also have diamonds. A year later they conducted an expedition from Lüderitz  to the mouth of the Orange. They found rich deposits on the north bank of the Orange River and the adjacent northern coastline and established a tent camp from which Oranjemund developed.

Due to the Great Depression, diamond mining was not taken up until 1935, and a year later workers' houses were erected. Oranjemund as a formal settlement was thus established in 1936. Production of mainly gem-quality diamonds has remained in the region of 2 million carats (400 kg) per year since inception of the mine, mainly through improvements in technology.

Until 2017 the town was run by Namdeb (formerly Consolidated Diamond Mines), now a subsidiary of De Beers. Access to, and settlement in Oranjemund was restricted to employees and their relatives. Its infrastructure is superior to that of other towns in Namibia's South, due to it not being dependent on cost recovery from its inhabitants. In the second half of the 20th century, Oranjemund featured a large recreational complex with swimming pool, cinema, restaurants and bars. Water is still provided free of charge, and until 2016 so was electricity.

Oranjemund was proclaimed a town in 2011.

Transportation
There is a border post to South Africa at the south end of the Ernest Oppenheimer Bridge. Until the town was opened in 2017, only persons with pre-application of 1 month were allowed to cross the border.

Oranjemund is connected to Rosh Pinah via a tarred road along the Namibian shore of the Orange River. This road was inaugurated at the time of the town proclamation in 2011.

Geography

Climate
Oranjemund has a desert climate (BWk, according to the Köppen climate classification), with pleasant temperatures throughout the year.

Politics
Oranjemund was privately owned by De Beers until 2017, and thus governed by the diamond mining company's administration. In 2011 the political administration was handed over to government which proclaimed it a town. It is now governed by a town council that has seven seats.

The first election run in Oranjemund was a by-election of the 2010 local authority election, 2,221 registered voters elected local authority councillors for the first time on 16 March 2012. SWAPO won the elections, and since 23 March 2012 Henry Edward Coetzee is the town's mayor.

SWAPO also won the 2020 local authority election but lost majority control over the town council. SWAPO obtained 935 votes and gained three seats. Independent Patriots for Change (IPC), an opposition party formed in August 2020, gained 737 votes and also three seats. The remaining seat went to the Landless People's Movement (LPM, a new party registered in 2018) with 158 votes.

References

External links
 Oranjemund Town Council, official website
 Oranjemund Online, unofficial website with historic pictures
 Oranjemund weather conditions

1928 establishments in South West Africa
Namibia–South Africa border crossings
Populated places in the ǁKaras Region
Mining communities in Africa
Towns in Namibia
Mining in Namibia